T. L. Hanna High School is located at 2600 Highway 81 North, outside the city limits of Anderson, South Carolina, United States. It is one of two high schools in Anderson School District Five and has a population of nearly 1,800 students. On July 1, 2015, Shawn Tobin was appointed as principal taking the place of long time principal Sheila Hilton, who retired. In 2019, Tobin retired to be replaced by T.L. Hanna graduate, Walter Mayfield. In 1999, the school was named "Palmetto's Finest" by the South Carolina Department of Education. In 2000, it was named a National Blue Ribbon School by the U.S. Department of Education.

History

Before T.L. Hanna High School, there was a Boys High School (located at what is now the Hanna-Westside Extension Campus) and a Girls High School. In 1951, Girl's High School changed its name to T.L. Hanna High School after its first principal Thomas Lucas Hanna. In 1961, the school moved to a new site on Marchbanks Avenue, the current site of McCants Middle School, and became co-ed in 1962.

Prior to 1971, T.L. Hanna was Anderson School District 5's all-white high school (Westside was the African-American school); in 1971, the district finally integrated after the Supreme Court's 1954 ruling in Brown v. Board of Education.  During the first year of integration, each grade's student government had two co-presidents, two co-vice presidents, etc., one white and one black.

In 1992, the school moved to its current location on Highway 81. In 1996, McDuffie High School closed as an independent vocational/non-college preparatory high school and became the Hanna-Westside Extension Campus, a change which increased and substantially diversified T.L. Hanna's student population (prior to 1996, many African-American students who were zoned for Hanna attended McDuffie, and the school's population made it state 3A instead of 4A). It has been an International Baccalaureate school since 2010.

T.L. Hanna recently expanded by adding a freshman academy, math hall, new auxiliary gym, and new sports area.

Athletics

State championships 
 Basketball - Boys: 1960, 1966, 1967
 Basketball - Girls: 1981
 Cross Country - Boys: 1981, 1982, 1983, 1984
 Cross Country - Girls: 1993, 1994
 Golf - Boys: 1974, 1983, 1993, 1994
 Soccer - Boys: 1980, 1996
 Soccer - Girls: 2012
 Tennis - Boys: 1974, 1975, 1976, 1977, 1978, 1979, 1983, 1985, 1987, 1988, 1989, 2021
 Tennis - Girls: 1987, 2013, 
 Track - Boys: 1960, 1963, 1964, 1965, 1969, 1975, 1977, 1979, 1981, 1982, 1983, 1984, 1992, 1993
 Track - Girls: 1993, 1994

Notable alumni

 Chadwick Boseman (1976–2020) (Class of 1995), actor, writer, and director, Marshall, 42, Get On Up, Draft Day, Captain America: Civil War, Black Panther 
 Ben Boulware (born 1994), former linebacker for Clemson University
 Martavis Bryant (born 1991), former wide receiver for the Oakland Raiders and Pittsburgh Steelers of the NFL
 Michael Clowers, Broadway veteran and former Director and choreographer for the world famous Radio City Rockettes. 
 Cameran Eubanks (born 1983) - MTV Real World, BravoTV's Southern Charm
 Preston Jones (born 1970), football player
James "Radio" Kennedy inspired the feature film, Radio. Cuba Gooding Jr. portrayed Kennedy in the film. A large statue of "Radio" is located on the school grounds today.
 Rafael Little (born 1986), former running back for Calgary Stampeders of the Canadian Football League
 Jim Rice (born 1953), Baseball Hall of Fame player for Boston Red Sox; attended his final year of high school here in 1971
 Stephen D. Thorne (1953–1986), NASA astronaut
James Michael Tyler (1962-2021), actor who played Gunther on the sitcom Friends
 Nate Woody (born 1960), former defensive coordinator at Georgia Tech

MTV's Made
MTV came to T.L. Hanna High School in September 2007 to cast for Made, a reality show featuring makeovers of high school students.

References

Public high schools in South Carolina
Schools in Anderson County, South Carolina
International Baccalaureate schools in South Carolina